Mimi Pinson may refer to:
 "Mimi Pinson", a short story by Alfred de Musset
 Mimi Pinson, Ruggero Leoncavallo's 1913 rewrite of his opera La bohème
 Mimi Pinson (operetta) a 1915 operetta with music by Henri Goublier and a libretto by Maurice Ordonneau and Francis Gally
 Mimi Pinson (1924 film), a French silent film
 Mimi Pinson (1958 film), a French film